"I'm Not Jesus" is a song by the Finnish cello metal band Apocalyptica, featuring Corey Taylor from Slipknot and Stone Sour. The single was released on September 17, 2007 and again on March 4, 2008, on the album Worlds Collide.

The song thematizes child abuse by clerics. Corey Taylor sings from the perspective of a man who was sexually abused by a priest when he was a child and now confronts his abuser.

The song was co-written by ex-Filter guitarist and composer Geno Lenardo and vocalist Johnny Andrews.

Music video 
The music video, directed by Tony Petrossian, featured Corey Taylor recording, and Apocalyptica members playing their instruments. The video also includes various film shots of children in torn/old clothes, and behind fences or various other objects. Every child shows no emotion in their facial expression.

Track listing 
Basic edition
 "I'm Not Jesus" feat. Corey Taylor - 3:35
 "Worlds Collide" - 4:29

Premium edition
 "I'm Not Jesus" feat. Corey Taylor - 3:35
 "Worlds Collide" - 4:29
 "S.O.S. (Anything But Love)" (instrumental)
 "Burn" - 4:18

Personnel 
Corey Taylor - vocals
Eicca Toppinen – rhythm cello
Paavo Lötjönen – bass cello
Perttu Kivilaakso – lead cello
Mikko Sirén – drums
Jacob Hellner - production

Chart positions

References

External links

2007 singles
Apocalyptica songs
Corey Taylor songs
Songs critical of religion
Music videos directed by Tony Petrossian
Songs written by Johnny Andrews
2007 songs
Sony BMG singles